Lubabalo Siphosethu 'Tera' Mtembu (born 9 December 1990) is a South African rugby union footballer for the New England Free Jacks of Major League Rugby (MLR). His playing position is either as a flanker or eighthman.

References

External links
 
 

1990 births
Living people
South African rugby union players
Sharks (Currie Cup) players
Sharks (rugby union) players
Sportspeople from Qonce
Rugby union flankers
Rugby union number eights
South Africa international rugby sevens players
South Africa Under-20 international rugby union players
Rugby sevens players at the 2010 Commonwealth Games
Commonwealth Games bronze medallists for South Africa
Commonwealth Games rugby sevens players of South Africa
Commonwealth Games medallists in rugby sevens
New England Free Jacks players
Medallists at the 2010 Commonwealth Games